The Somali serotine (Neoromicia somalica) is a species of vesper bat. It is found in Benin, Botswana, Burkina Faso, Cameroon, Central African Republic, Chad, Republic of the Congo, Democratic Republic of the Congo, Ivory Coast, Eritrea, Ethiopia, Ghana, Guinea, Guinea-Bissau, Kenya, Liberia, Malawi, Namibia, Nigeria, Rwanda, Senegal, Sierra Leone, Somalia, Sudan, Tanzania, Togo, Uganda, and Zimbabwe. Its natural habitat is savanna.

References

Somali serotine
Bats of Africa
Fauna of East Africa
Fauna of Somalia
Somali serotine
Taxonomy articles created by Polbot
Taxa named by Oldfield Thomas